Candida zemplinina is a yeast species that is osmotolerant, psychrotolerant and ferments sweet botrytized wines. Its type strain is 10-372T (=CBS 9494T =NCAIM Y016667T).

References

Further reading

 
 
 

Fungi described in 2003
zemplinina
Yeasts